Jennifer A. Herdt is an American philosopher and Gilbert L. Stark Professor of Christian Ethics and Senior Associate Dean for Academic Affairs at Yale Divinity School.
She is known for her works on moral philosophy.

Books
Forming Humanity: Redeeming the German Bildung Tradition (Chicago, 2019)
Putting On Virtue: The Legacy of the Splendid Vices (Chicago, 2008)
Religion and Faction in Hume’s Moral Philosophy (Cambridge, 1997)

References

20th-century American philosophers
Philosophy academics
21st-century American philosophers
Yale Divinity School faculty
Christian ethicists
Princeton University alumni
East Tennessee State University faculty
Oberlin College alumni
Hume scholars
1967 births
Living people